Theophrasta is a genus of flowering plants in the family Primulaceae, native to the Caribbean island of Hispaniola. Named in honor of the naturalist Theophrastus, they are occasionally kept as ornamentals in greenhouses.

Species
Currently accepted species include:

Theophrasta americana L.
Theophrasta jussieui Lindl.

References

Theophrastaceae
Primulaceae genera
Flora of Haiti
Flora of the Dominican Republic
Primulaceae
Flora without expected TNC conservation status